Kenneth Ifemene is an Anglican bishop in Nigeria: he is the current Bishop of Ikwo.

Notes

Living people
Anglican bishops of Ikwo
21st-century Anglican bishops in Nigeria
Year of birth missing (living people)